The All-Star Cup (stylised as "All*Star Cup") is a celebrity Golf match first held at the Celtic Manor Resort in Newport in 2005 that pitted two teams of celebrities against each other in a Ryder Cup-style competition.

The first series was aired on Sky One, with the second series being covered on ITV with extra coverage on ITV2.

Series 1
In the 2005 competition the American team were captained by Mark O'Meara and the Europeans were captained by Colin Montgomerie. The event was aired on Sky One, presented by Kirsty Gallacher and Jamie Theakston and created by Anthony McPartlin and Declan Donnelly.

The tournament ended dramatically, with the result only decided on the 18th hole of the final match, when Ronan Keating and Damian Lewis won the hole against Michael Douglas and Mark Spitz to win the cup for Europe by a score of 91–89.

Replaced Boris Becker *

Series 2
The 2006 tournament took place from 26 to 28 August and was broadcast across ITV and ITV2 during the August Bank Holiday weekend, with Ant & Dec taking up the role of hosting the live coverage on ITV, and Kirsty Gallacher and Ben Shephard fronting the ITV2 coverage. Colin Montgomerie returned to captain the European team, with the American team now being captained by Todd Hamilton.

Europe won the cup for the second time. Entertainer Bruce Forsyth holed the winning putt, aged 78. He had been dubbed 'The Golfather' by his teammates during the contest. 

† James Keach replaced Chazz Palminteri during the second day due to injury.
†† ''Jane Seymour is British, but she represented the United States where she is a naturalized citizen.

Cancellation
The All-Star Cup did not have a third series as ITV would not put up the money for 2007.

External links

2000s British sports television series
2000s British game shows
2005 British television series debuts
2006 British television series endings
ITV game shows
Sky UK original programming
Sport in Newport, Wales
Celebrity competitions